Kaistia defluvii is a Gram-negative, aerobic and non-motile bacterium from the genus of Kaistia which has been isolated from river sediments from the River Geumho in Korea.

References

External links
Type strain of Kaistia defluvii at BacDive -  the Bacterial Diversity Metadatabase

Hyphomicrobiales
Bacteria described in 2012